The 1996–97 Copa del Rey was the 95th staging of the Copa del Rey.

The competition started on 4 September 1996 and concluded on 28 June 1997 with the final, held at the Santiago Bernabéu Stadium in Madrid.

First round

Second round

Third round

Bracket

Round of 16 

|}

First leg

Second leg

Quarter-finals 

|}

First leg

Second leg

Semi-finals 

|}

First leg

Second leg

Final

Top goalscorers

References

External links 
 www.linguasport.com 

Copa del Rey seasons
1996–97 in Spanish football cups